Osibisa is the self-titled debut album by British afro rock band Osibisa, released in 1971 by MCA. It was reissued in 2004 as a two-CD pack together with Woyaya by BGO Records.

Track listing

Charts

Personnel
Osibisi
 Teddy Osei – tenor saxophone, flute, African drums, percussion, lead vocals on "The Dawn", "Music for Gong Gong" and "Ayiko Bia"
 Sol Amarfio – drums, percussion, vocals
 Mac Tontoh – trumpet, flugelhorn, kabasa, percussion, vocals
 Spartacus R (Roy Bedeau) – bass guitar, assorted percussion 
 Wendell Richardson – lead guitar, lead vocals on "Think About the People"
 Robert Bailey – organ, piano, timbales, percussion, vocals
 Loughty Lasisi Amao – tenor saxophone, baritone saxophone, congas, percussion

Production
 Tony Visconti - producer
 John Punter - engineer
 Martin Rushent - assistant engineer
 Roger Dean - cover illustration, Osibisi logo
 Roughedge - cover design

References

 All information from back cover of CD Osibisa (Copyright © 1971 MCA Records International, Inc.)
 Discogs 
 Allmusic 

1971 debut albums
Osibisa albums
MCA Records albums
Decca Records albums
Albums produced by Tony Visconti
Albums with cover art by Roger Dean (artist)